The Kawasaki KX125 is a 2-stroke motocross motorcycle introduced by Kawasaki in 1974 to 2008.

KX125
Off-road motorcycles
Two-stroke motorcycles